Dəmirçi or Damirchi or Demirchi or Damerchi may refer to:

 Dəmirçi, Masally, Azerbaijan
 Dəmirçi, Nakhchivan, Azerbaijan
 Dəmirçi, Shamakhi, Azerbaijan
 Damirchi-ye Kharabahsi, Ardabil Province, Iran
 Damirchi-ye Olya, Ardabil Province, Iran
 Damirchi-ye Sofla, Ardabil Province, Iran
 Damirchi, Hashtrud, East Azerbaijan Province, Iran
 Damirchi, Malekan, East Azerbaijan Province, Iran
 Damirchi, Meyaneh, East Azerbaijan Province, Iran
 Damirchi, Sarab, East Azerbaijan Province, Iran
 Damirchi Haddadan, East Azerbaijan Province, Iran
 Damirchi, Markazi, Iran
 Damirchi, Naqadeh, West Azerbaijan Province, Iran
 Damirchi, Shahin Dezh, West Azerbaijan Province, Iran
 Demirci, Manisa Province, Turkey

See also
 Demirci (disambiguation)
 Dəmirçilər (disambiguation)
 Demirciler (disambiguation)